San Pablo Dam Road is a major arterial road linking San Pablo and Orinda, California in the United States, which connects San Pablo Avenue and Interstate 80 with Highway 24, bypassing the Eastshore Freeway. It is also signed as Camino Pablo in Orinda.

The road passes through the communities of El Sobrante and Richmond. It begins at San Pablo Avenue and ends south of Highway 24 in Orinda, where it merges with Moraga Way en route to Moraga. The roadway travels along the San Pablo Canyon and San Pablo Reservoir along the former rail right-of-way of the California and Nevada Railroad. It passes by Kennedy Grove Regional Recreation Area. It has two lanes for the majority of its length but increases to 4 lanes when traveling through urban areas.

References

Streets in Contra Costa County, California
El Sobrante, Contra Costa County, California
Orinda, California
San Pablo, California